CSM Roman, formerly known as HCM Roman, was a professional women's handball club in Roman, Romania.

Kits

References

External links
  
 

Liga Națională (women's handball) clubs
Romanian handball clubs
Handball clubs established in 2001
Handball clubs disestablished in 2018
2001 establishments in Romania 
2018 disestablishments in Romania